The Hammonds House Museum is a museum for African American fine art, located at 503 Peeples Street SW in the West End neighborhood of Atlanta, Georgia. It is located in the 1857 Victorian house, former residence of Dr. Otis Thrash Hammonds, a prominent Atlanta physician and patron of the arts.

The Victorian house is believed to have been built in 1857, and to be one of the three oldest houses in West End.

See also
List of museums focused on African Americans

References

External links
 Hammonds House official website

Museums in Atlanta
African-American museums in Georgia (U.S. state)
Art museums and galleries in Georgia (U.S. state)
African-American historic house museums